The Sony FE 70-200mm F2.8 GM OSS is a premium, constant maximum aperture full-frame (FE) telephoto zoom lens for the Sony E-mount, announced by Sony on February 3, 2016.

The 70-200mm f/2.8 lens is popular among event photographers and photojournalists where the lower light capabilities are required. Some portrait photographers also prefer this lens for the improved background blur produced by the f/2.8 aperture.

Though designed for Sony's full frame E-mount cameras, the lens can be used on Sony's APS-C E-mount camera bodies, with an equivalent full-frame field-of-view of 105-300mm.

Build quality
The lens showcases an off-white weather resistant plastic and metal exterior with a rubber focus and zoom ring. The lens features external controls for enabling image stabilization, limiting the focal range of the lens, and changing focusing modes. It also features three external focus-hold buttons for locking in focus on a subject in motion. The lens maintains its physical length throughout its zoom range.

The Sony FE 70-200mm F2.8 GM OSS lens is one of Sony's few telephoto lenses that are compatible with their own dedicated 1.4x and 2.0x lens teleconvertors. When equipped, the combination yields an effective focal length of 98-280mm (f/4.0) and 140-400mm (f/5.6), respectively.

Image quality
The lens is exceptionally sharp throughout its zoom range at its maximum aperture of f/2.8. Distortion, vignetting, and chromatic aberration are all well controlled.

When using the 1.4x and 2.0x teleconverters, image quality falls off overall but remains fairly sharp.

See also
List of Sony E-mount lenses
Sony FE 70-200mm F4 G OSS
Sony FE 100-400mm F4.5-5.6 GM OSS

References

Camera lenses introduced in 2014
28-135